The 2022 Women's FIH Hockey Nations Cup was the first edition of the Women's FIH Hockey Nations Cup, the annual qualification tournament for the Women's FIH Pro League organised by the International Hockey Federation. The tournament was held at the Estadio Betero in Valencia, Spain from 11 to 17 December 2022.

India as the winner, was promoted for the 2023–24 Women's FIH Pro League.

Teams
The eight highest ranked teams not participating in the Women's FIH Pro League participated in the tournament: Canada withdrew from the tournament and was replaced by Chile.

Head Coach:  Sergio Vigil

Doménica Ananías
Fernanda Villagrán
Monserrat Obon
Denise Rojas
Fernanda Flores
Sofía Filipek
Manuela Urroz
Camila Caram (C)
Francisca Tala
Agustina Solano
Francisca Parra
Paula Valdivia
María Maldonado
Fernanda Arrieta
Amanda Martínez
Natalia Salvador (GK)
Montserrat Araya (GK)
Josefina Khamis
Laura Müller
Francisca Irazoqui

Head Coach:  Janneke Schopman

Navjot Kaur
Gurjit Kaur
Deep Grace Ekka
Monika Malik
Sonika Tandi
Nikki Pradhan
Savita Punia (C, GK)
Sangita Kumari 
Nisha Warsi
Vandana Katariya
Bichu Devi Kharibam (GK)
Udita Duhan
Lalremsiami
Jyoti
Navneet Kaur
Sushila Chanu 
Salima Tete
Neha Goyal
Ishika Chaudhary
Beauty Dungdung

Head Coach:  Sean Dancer

Elizabeth Murphy (GK)
Sarah McAuley
Zara Malseed
Michelle Carey
Róisín Upton
Niamh Carey
Sarah Hawkshaw
Kathryn Mullan (C)
Hannah McLoughlin
Sarah Torrans
Elena Tice
Naomi Carroll
Charlotte Beggs
Caoimhe Perdue
Katie McKee
Holly Micklem (GK)
Erin Getty
Siofra O'Brien
Ellen Curran
Christina Hamill

Head Coach:  Robert Justus

Sofia Monserrat (GK)
Teresa Dalla Vittoria
Ilaria Sarnari
Ailin Oviedo
Augustina Hasselstrom
Elettra Bormida
Emilia Munitis
Lucía Ines Caruso (GK)
Agueda Moroni
Anotnella Bruni
Sofía Maldonado
Federica Carta (C)
Sara Puglisi (C)
Mercedes Pastor
Sofia Laurito
Lara Oviedo
Ivanna Pessina
Luciana Gallimberti
Camila Machín
Chiara di Bella

Head Coach:  Jude Menezes

Eika Nakamura (GK)
Yu Asai
Miyu Suzuki
Moeka Tsubouchi
Yuri Nagai (C)
Hazuki Nagai
Shihori Oikawa
Miki Kozuka
Chiko Fujibayashi
Nakagomi Akari
Shiho Kobayakawa
Kanon Mori
Mai Toriyama
<li value=23>Saki Tanaka
Mami Karino
<li value=26>Amiru Shimada
Akio Tanaka ([[Goalkeeper (field hockey)|GK]])
Rui Takashima
<li value=32>Jyunon Kawai
Sara Yoshihara

|bodystyle=font-size:110%}}
Head Coach: Han Jin-soo

<li value=2>Lee Ju-yeon ([[Goalkeeper (field hockey)|GK]])
Kim Eun-ji
<li value=7>Seo Jung-eun
An Hyo-ju
<li value=10>Cheon Eun-bi ([[Captain (sports)|C]])
Cho Hye-jin
Kim Seo-na
<li value=14>Lee Yu-ri
<li value=16>Kim Jeong-in
Seo Su-young
<li value=19>Kim Min-jeong
Yoon Da-eun
<li value=22>An Su-jin
Choi Min-young
Park Seung-ae
<li value=27>Pak Ho-jeong
Choi Ji-yun
Lee Yu-jin
Lee Jin-min ([[Goalkeeper (field hockey)|GK]])
Kim Eun-ji ([[Goalkeeper (field hockey)|GK]])

|bodystyle=font-size:110%}}
Head Coach: Giles Bonnet

Anelle van Deventer ([[Goalkeeper (field hockey)|GK]])
<li value=8>Kristen Paton
<li value=10>Onthatile Zulu
<li value=16>Erin Christie ([[Captain (sports)|C]])
Charné Maddocks
Hannah Pearce
<li value=21>Ongeziwe Mali
<li value=25>Kirsty Adams
<li value=28>Quanita Bobbs
Tarryn Lombard
<li value=31>Bianca Wood
<li value=33>Marlize van Tonder ([[Goalkeeper (field hockey)|GK]])
<li value=35>Jean-Leigh du Toit
<li value=39>Stephanie Botha
<li value=42>Marie Louw
Kayla Swarts
Taheera Augousti
Ntsopa Mokoena

|bodystyle=font-size:110%}}
Head Coach:  Adrian Lock

<li value=2>Laura Barrios
<li value=4>Sara Barrios
<li value=6>Clara Badia
Júlia Strappato
Lucía Jiménez
María López ([[Captain (sports)|C]])
Belén Iglesias
Marta Segú
Florencia Amundson
Constanza Amundson
<li value=15>Maialen García
Candela Mejías
Clara Ycart
<li value=20>Xantal Giné
Beatriz Pérez
Laia Vidosa
<li value=24>Alejandra Torres-Quevedo
<li value=26>Clara Pérez ([[Goalkeeper (field hockey)|GK]])
<li value=30>Patricia Álvarez
<li value=32>Jana Martínez ([[Goalkeeper (field hockey)|GK]])

Preliminary round
The match schedule was announced on 5 September 2022.

Pool A

|name_ESP=
|name_ITA=
|name_KOR=

|result1=SF |result2=SF
|res_col_header=Q
|col_SF=green1 |text_SF=Semi-finals

|class_rules = 1) points; 2) matches won; 3) goal difference; 4) goals for; 5) head-to-head result; 6) field goals scored.
}}

|score=1–1
|team2=
|report=Report
|goals1=Cheon 
|goals2=Carta 
|umpires=Durga Devi (IND)Junko Wagatsuma (JPN)
}}

|score=2–0
|team2=
|report=Report
|goals1=Ycart Torres-Quevedo 
|goals2=
|umpires=Liu Xiaoying (CHN)Kristy Robertson (AUS)
}}

|score=2–1
|team2=
|report=Report
|goals1=Carroll Mullan 
|goals2=L. Oviedo 
|umpires=Natalia Lodeiro (URU)Ymkje van Slooten (NED)
}}

|score=0–3
|team2=
|report=Report
|goals1=
|goals2=F. Amundson Álvarez 
|umpires=Magali Sergeant (BEL)Junko Wagatsuma (JPN)
}}

|score=2–2
|team2=
|report=Report
|goals1=Hawkshaw Mullan 
|goals2=Cho An 
|umpires=Kristy Robertson (AUS)Ymkje van Slooten (NED)
}}

|score=0–0
|team2=
|report=Report
|goals1=
|goals2=
|umpires=Vilma Bagdanskienė (LTU)Durga Devi (IND)
}}

Pool B

|name_IND=
|name_JPN=
|name_RSA=

|class_rules = 1) points; 2) matches won; 3) goal difference; 4) goals for; 5) head-to-head result; 6) field goals scored.
}}

|score=3–1
|team2=
|report=Report
|goals1=Sangita Sonika Navneet 
|goals2=Villagrán 
|umpires=Mariana Reydo (ARG)Magali Sergeant (BEL)
}}

|score=2–1
|team2=
|report=Report
|goals1=Oikawa Toriyama 
|goals2=Bobbs 
|umpires=Vilma Bagdanskienė (LTU)Natalia Lodeiro (URU)
}}

|score=1–2
|team2=
|report=Report
|goals1=Takashima 
|goals2=Salima Beauty 
|umpires=Liu Xiaoying (CHN)Mariana Reydi (ARG)
}}

|score=2–1
|team2=
|report=Report
|goals1=Urroz Villagrán 
|goals2=Mokoena 
|umpires=Vilma Bagdanskienė (LTU)Ana Faias (POR)
}}

|score=2–0
|team2=
|report=Report
|goals1=Deep Grace Gurjit 
|goals2=
|umpires=Ana Faias (POR)Natalia Lodeiro (URU)
}}

|score=1–1
|team2=
|report=Report
|goals1=Arrieta 
|goals2=Yoshihara 
|umpires=Liu Xiaoying (CHN)Magali Sergeant (BEL)
}}

Classification round

Bracket
|2||0
|16 December||0||1

|17 December| (p.s.o.)|1 (2)||1 (1)

|17 December||1||4
}}

5–8th place semifinals

|score=2–0
|team2=
|report=Report
|goals1=Pessina L. Oviedo 
|goals2=
|umpires=Vilma Bagdanskienė (LTU)Ymkje van Slooten (NED)
}}

|score=0–1
|team2=
|report=Report
|goals1=
|goals2=Lee Yu-j. 
|umpires=Ana Faias (POR)Durga Devi (IND)
}}

Seventh and eighth place

|score=1–4
|team2=
|report=Report
|goals1=Christie 
|goals2=Maldonado Losada Tala Arrieta 
|umpires=Durga Devi (IND)Ana Faias (POR)
}}

Fifth and sixth place

|score=1–1
|team2=
|report=Report
|goals1=Carta 
|goals2=Cho 
|umpires=Natalia Lodeiro (URU)Ymkje van Slooten (NED)
|penalties1=Pessina Moroni Pastor Laurito 
|penaltyscore=2–1
|penalties2= Kim S. An H. Cheon Lee Yu-j. Seo J.
}}

Final round

Bracket
|1||0
|16 December| (p.s.o.)|1 (2)||1 (1)

|17 December||0||1

|17 December||3||2
}}

Semi-finals

|score=1–0
|team2=
|report=Report
|goals1=S. Barrios 
|goals2=
|umpires=Mariana Reydo (ARG)Kristy Robertson (AUS)
}}

 
|score=1–1
|team2=
|report=
Report
|goals1=Udita 
|goals2=Carroll 
|umpires=Liu Xiaoying (CHN)Junko Wagatsuma (JPN)
|penalties1=Salima Lalremsiami Navneet Sonika Neha 
|penaltyscore=2–1
|penalties2= Hamill Curran McLoughlin Upton Mullan
}}

Third and fourth place

|score=3–2
|team2=
|report=Report
|goals1=Karino Toriyama Y. Nagai 
|goals2=Mullan Carey 
|umpires=Kristy Robertson (AUS)Magali Sergeant (BEL)
}}

Final

|score=0–1
|team2=
|report=Report
|goals1=
|goals2=Gurjit 
|umpires=Mariana Reydo (ARG)Junko Wagatsuma (JPN)
}}

Awards
The awards were announced on 17 December 2022.

Final standings

 |win_CHI=2 |draw_CHI=1 |loss_CHI=2 |gf_CHI=8 |ga_CHI=7
|name_IND= |win_IND=4 |draw_IND=1 |loss_IND=0 |gf_IND=9 |ga_IND=3
|name_IRE= |win_IRE=1 |draw_IRE=2 |loss_IRE=2 |gf_IRE=7 |ga_IRE=9
|name_ITA= |win_ITA=1 |draw_ITA=3 |loss_ITA=1 |gf_ITA=5 |ga_ITA=4
|name_JPN= |win_JPN=2 |draw_JPN=1 |loss_JPN=2 |gf_JPN=7 |ga_JPN=7
|name_RSA= |win_RSA=0 |draw_RSA=0 |loss_RSA=5 |gf_RSA=3 |ga_RSA=12
|name_KOR= |win_KOR=1 |draw_KOR=3 |loss_KOR=1 |gf_KOR=5 |ga_KOR=7
|name_ESP= |win_ESP=3 |draw_ESP=1 |loss_ESP=1 |gf_ESP=6 |ga_ESP=1

|team1=IND |team2=ESP |team3=JPN |team4=IRE |team5=ITA |team6=KOR |team7=CHI |team8=RSA
|pos_IND= |pos_ESP= |pos_JPN=

|res_col_header=Status
|result1=1st
|col_1st=green1 |text_1st=Qualified for 2023–24 FIH Pro League
}}

Goalscorers
 Kathryn Mullan

|2 goals=
 Fernanda Arrieta
 Fernanda Villagrán
 Gurjit Kaur
 Naomi Carroll
 Federica Carta
 Lara Oviedo
 Mai Toriyama
 Cho Hye-jin
 Florencia Amundson

|1 goal=
 Denise Losada
 María Maldonado
 Francisca Tala
 Manuela Urroz
 Beauty Dungdung
 Udita Duhan
 Deep Grace Ekka
 Navneet Kaur
 Sangita Kumari
 Sonika Tandi
 Salima Tete
 Niamh Carey
 Sarah Hawkshaw
 Ivanna Pessina
 Mami Karino
 Yuri Nagai
 Shihori Oikawa
 Rui Takashima
 Sara Yoshihara
 Quanita Bobbs
 Erin Christie
 Ntsopa Mokoena
 An Su-jin
 Cheon Eun-bi
 Lee Yu-jin
 Patricia Álvarez
 Alejandra Torres-Quevedo
 Clara Ycart
 Sara Barrios
}}

See also
 2022 Men's FIH Hockey Nations Cup

References

Women's FIH Hockey Nations Cup
Nations Cup
FIH Hockey Nations Cup
International women's field hockey competitions hosted by Spain
FIH Hockey Nations Cup
Sport in Valencia
21st century in Valencia